Noah Quinn Gragson (born July 15, 1998) is an American professional stock car racing driver. He competes full-time in the NASCAR Cup Series, driving the No. 42 Chevrolet Camaro ZL1 for Legacy Motor Club. He previously drove full-time in the NASCAR Xfinity Series for JR Motorsports from 2019 to 2022, and full-time in the NASCAR Camping World Truck Series for Kyle Busch Motorsports from 2017 to 2018.

Racing career

Early career

Gragson started racing Bandoleros at the Las Vegas Motor Speedway Bullring at the age of 13, eventually moving to compete in late models. Gragson also competed in the INEX Legends car racing series, winning the 2014 Young Lion Road Course championship.

Regional series

K&N Pro Series West

In 2015, Gragson joined Jefferson Pitts Racing in the NASCAR K&N Pro Series West in the No. 7 with sponsorship from AlertID, his ride being overseen by co-owner Jerry Pitts. In his series debut at Kern County Raceway Park, he finished third after qualifying eighth. At Tucson Speedway, Gragson battled with teammate Gracin Raz to score his first career victory. Later in the season at Meridian Speedway, Gragson recorded his first pole position and led 176 laps to win. In his first season of stock car racing, Gragson finished second in the final points standings behind Chris Eggleston with two wins, seven top fives, 11 top tens, becoming the ninth driver in series history to finish runner-up in points and win Rookie of the Year. After the season ended, he was named Rookie of the Year.

K&N Pro Series East
During the 2015 season, Gragson ran two races in the NASCAR K&N Pro Series East, finishing eighth in his debut at Watkins Glen International.

ARCA Racing Series

2015
In 2015, he joined Mason Mitchell Motorsports in the ARCA Racing Series, driving the No. 78 Ford Fusion at Kentucky Speedway. After qualifying eighth, he finished 14th, one lap behind race winner Ryan Reed.

2016
In 2016 he made 2 starts; one with Mason Mitchell Motorsports driving the No. 78 Chevrolet SS at Pocono finishing 30th and one in the season finale with Venturini Motorsports driving the No. 15 Toyota Camry at Kansas finishing 5th.

2017

In 2017 he competed in 5 races with Venturini with a best finish of 4th at Chicagoland.

2018
In 2018 he made 2 starts for DGR-Crosley in the No. 54 Toyota Camry at Daytona finishing 7th and Pocono where he scored the pole, dominated much of the early going, and finished 10th.

Camping World Truck Series

2016

In preparation for the 2017 season, he drove the No. 18 Toyota from KBM at the Phoenix International Raceway and Homestead-Miami Speedway events in an entry fielded by Wauters Motorsports who also fielded Super Late Model’s for Gragson. In his debut at Phoenix, Gragson qualified 14th and finished 16th. Gragson raced at Homestead as well, qualifying 10th and finishing 15th.

2017

On October 7, 2016, he was hired by Kyle Busch Motorsports to compete in the NASCAR Camping World Truck Series in 2017.

In 2017, he recorded his first career Truck win in the fall at Martinsville Speedway in the Texas Roadhouse 200 after passing Matt Crafton for the lead on the outside with 10 laps to go, he finished tenth in points.

2018

He returned to the No. 18 KBM truck for the 2018 season.

A week after wrecking with 2 laps to go while battling with Johnny Sauter for the win at Dover, Gragson dominated at Kansas in the 37 Kind Days 250 leading 128 out of 167 laps to score his 2nd career win.

During qualifying at Pocono Raceway, Gragson fell ill and was not cleared to race. Erik Jones replaced him for the race, but he was granted a playoff waiver and will still contend for the championship.

Gragson finished 2nd in the points standings, after finishing 3rd at Homestead.

Xfinity Series

2018

Gragson made his NASCAR Xfinity Series debut in the No. 18 for Joe Gibbs Racing at Richmond Raceway in 2018 as part of a three-race schedule that included further starts at Talladega Superspeedway and Dover International Speedway.

2019

On September 25, 2018, JR Motorsports announced that Gragson would drive the No. 1 Chevrolet full-time for the 2019 Xfinity Series, replacing Elliott Sadler who retired at the end of the 2018 season. However, on January 25, the team announced that Gragson would instead pilot the No. 9 and teammate Michael Annett would drive the No. 1. Gragson opened his rookie campaign with JR Motorsports by finishing 11th in the NASCAR Racing Experience 300 at Daytona International Speedway. He scored a ninth-place at Atlanta the next week for his first top-10 of the season and followed it up with his first top-five of the season the next week when he finished third at Las Vegas. Gragson would go on to produce several strong runs during the season including a season-best second-place at Michigan.

Gragson qualified for the Playoffs after the second Las Vegas race on the strength of seven top-fives and 17 top-10s in the regular season. Gragson scored his first DNF of his Xfinity Series career in the 2019 O'Reilly 300 at Texas Motor Speedway when contact on lap 150 with the No. 18 of Harrison Burton sent Gragson's car spinning through the frontstretch grass. Gragson was credited with a 30th-place finish.

2020

On February 11, 2020, Gragson announced Bass Pro Shops, Black Rifle Coffee Company, and True Timber would sponsor him as a primary sponsor for three races starting at the season opener at Daytona International Speedway. He went on to win the season-opening NASCAR Racing Experience 300. Gragson was in position to win a late-season race at Texas Motor Speedway but was passed by Harrison Burton in the final set of corners.

2021

On August 27, 2020, Gragson and JR Motorsports confirmed a third season together. At the end of the Atlanta race, he was involved in a fight with Daniel Hemric after a pit road mishap during the race. Neither driver was reprimanded by NASCAR. Hemric would later go on to win the Xfinity Series championship that year. On May 10, Gragson finished fourth at Darlington, but was disqualified when his car failed post-race inspection for unapproved suspension mounts. JR Motorsports filed and won the appeal, restoring Gragson's fourth-place finish and awarding him the 100,000 Dash 4 Cash bonus. He would later win at Darlington and Richmond to make the playoff before scoring a big win in Martinsville to make the Championship 4 for the first time in his career.

2022

Gragson began the 2022 season with a third-place finish at Daytona. He also scored wins at Phoenix, Talladega and Pocono. At Road America, Gragson had an on-road scuffle with Sage Karam, resulting in him triggering a 13-car pileup on lap 25. He was fined 35,000 and docked 30 driver and owner points for the incident. At the September Darlington race, Gragson won a three-car battle with Sheldon Creed and Kyle Larson on the closing laps. He also won the next three races at Kansas, Bristol, and Texas, becoming the first driver since Sam Ard in 1983 to win four straight Xfinity Series races. Gragson won his eighth race at Homestead to make his second straight Xfinity Championship 4 appearance. He would end up finishing 2nd in the Championship to Ty Gibbs.

Cup Series

2021

On January 14, 2021, Beard Motorsports announced Gragson would attempt to make his NASCAR Cup Series debut in the Daytona 500, driving the No. 62 Chevrolet. He was unable to set a qualifying time after failing inspection three times and started the Bluegreen Vacations Duel from the back; a wreck with Garrett Smithley and Brad Keselowski with four laps remaining ended his chances of making the 500.

2022

Gragson returned to Beard for the 2022 Daytona 500, this time successfully qualifying for the race. Gragson also signed with Kaulig Racing to share the No. 16 Cup car with A. J. Allmendinger and former rival Daniel Hemric.

In his first start in the Daytona 500 he was involved in The Big One late in the race with 10 laps to go while running 7th after getting wrecked by Kevin Harvick. In his 2nd start at Atlanta he would have much of the same luck wrecking hard into the second turn wall on lap 24 while running 17th after his car broke loose in the middle of turns 1 and 2.  At the 2022 Coke Zero Sugar 400, Gragson finished a Cup career-best finish of fifth.

Gragson drove the Hendrick Motorsports No. 48 at the Talladega, Charlotte Roval, Las Vegas, Homestead and the Martinsville races as a substitute for Alex Bowman, who sustained a concussion from a crash at Texas.

2023
On August 10, 2022, Gragson was announced as the driver for the No. 42 for Petty GMS Motorsports for 2023, replacing Ty Dillon.

Other racing

Late Model Racing

In 2017 he won the Winchester 400 and in his final ride with KBM, Gragson won the 2018 Snowball Derby after holding off Ty Majeski.

Pinty’s Series
His 2018 racing slate also included starts on the NASCAR Pinty's Series circuit in an effort to make himself a better driver via more seat time. Gragson also started working with a sports psychologist in 2018.

Controversies
In his time in NASCAR Gragson has been one of the most brash drivers on and off the track, on the circuit and is seen as one of the most abrasive drivers in the sport in the modern day. His sponsorship with Wendy's fast food chain, combined with his behavior has earned him the moniker of "The Beef" among fans.

2015
In the 2015 NASCAR K&N Pro Series West season finale at Phoenix, Gragson would attempt to wreck Chris Eggleston for the championship however it would be unsuccessful and Gragson would still finish 2nd in the standings to Eggleston.

2018
When Gragson won the 2018 Snowball Derby he attempted to kiss the Snowball Derby trophy girl Helena Ciappini, which immediately garnered attention and support towards Gragson with seemingly no consent being given, the next week however he would take her to the end-of-season NASCAR Awards Show as his date.

2020
In the 2020 Boyd Gaming 300, Gragson would appear to intentionally spin fellow racer Myatt Snider with 38 laps to go, after the race he attempted to apologize and give him a fist bump but was denied. Later in the season in the 2020 Pocono Green 225, Snider would do what Gragson did however he would in turn cause more than 5 cars to wreck along with him, under caution, Gragson would run into him to voice his displeasure.
 
At the end of the 2020 Alsco 300, he was involved in a fight with Harrison Burton after Gragson pushed him into the wall in the closing laps. Neither driver was reprimanded by NASCAR.

2021
In the 2021 Contender Boats 250 Gragson was leading with 3 laps to go in the race with a sizable 7 second lead over 2nd place Tyler Reddick when lapped car David Starr blew a right front tire right in front of Gragson leaving Gragson with nowhere to go and slamming into Starr at full speed. When Gragson got out of his car he was quoted as saying "what are you gonna do you’ve got dipshits in the way every single week" and would further double down on Twitter which fueled a lot of hatred towards Gragson as Starr was seen not at fault for the incident due to it being a blown tire, this would be furthered when the owner of Starr's No. 13 MBM Motorsports car, Carl Long would publicly call out Gragson later in the week.
 
At the end of the 2021 EchoPark 250, he was involved in a fight with Daniel Hemric after a pit road mishap during the race. Neither driver was reprimanded by NASCAR in this case either.
 
Under red flag in the 2021 Snowflake 100 Gragson would be involved an incident which took out Johanna Robbins in which her team owner came over and cussed out Gragson and threatened to fight him.

2022
25 laps into the 2022 Henry 180 at Road America, he doorslammed Sage Karam exiting Turn 2 onto the backstraightaway after a battle for P10 that happened in the first two turns. The initial skirmish incidentally led to 14 other cars being involved thanks to dust being kicked up, shielding the vision for others. Karam berated Gragson's actions in an interview after the race, saying that "..not a good role model, he is", and adding that he "...[doesn't] think Noah is going to change." Gragson was fined 35,000 dollars and was docked 30 driver points while his team JR Motorsports was docked the same amount in owner points for the incident.

Personal life
Gragson attended Bishop Gorman High School in Las Vegas, Nevada for two years. He finished his high school education online at K12. Gragson enjoys downhill mountain biking, and is an avid video game player, saying in an interview that he would perhaps spend Dash 4 Cash winnings on the popular video game Fortnite.

Noah has a twin sister, Addie Gragson, who is an entrepreneur, model, and mixed media artist.

Gragson's great-grandfather was Oran K. Gragson, the longest-serving mayor in Las Vegas history, who helped curb corruption in the city and ended racial segregation in the casinos. Noah's father Scott is a real estate agent and a businessman. In May 2019, Scott, who has financially supported his son's racing career, was involved in a fatal crash in which his blood alcohol content was nearly twice the legal limit. He settled out of court with the victims and is currently serving an 8-to-20-year prison sentence.

Motorsports career results

Stock car career summary

† As Gragson was a guest driver, he was ineligible for championship points.

NASCAR
(key) (Bold – Pole position awarded by qualifying time. Italics – Pole position earned by points standings or practice time. * – Most laps led.)

Cup Series

Daytona 500

Xfinity Series

Camping World Truck Series

K&N Pro Series East

K&N Pro Series West

 Season still in progress
 Ineligible for series points

Pinty's Series

ARCA Racing Series
(key) (Bold – Pole position awarded by qualifying time. Italics – Pole position earned by points standings or practice time. * – Most laps led.)

References

External links

 
 

Living people
1998 births
ARCA Menards Series drivers
ARCA Midwest Tour drivers
Bishop Gorman High School alumni
NASCAR drivers
Racing drivers from Las Vegas
Racing drivers from Nevada
Sportspeople from Las Vegas
Kyle Busch Motorsports drivers
Joe Gibbs Racing drivers
JR Motorsports drivers